Nowjeh Mehr (also known as  Nowj Mehr) is a village in Nowjeh Mehr Rural District, Siah Rud District, Jolfa County, East Azerbaijan Province, Iran. At the 2006 census, its population was 436, in 102 families.

References 

Populated places in Jolfa County